Edinburg Mill is a grist mill in Edinburg, Virginia. The three-story wood-framed building stands on Stony Creek, set on a limestone basement. A working mill until 1978, the original structure was built in 1848 by the Grandstaff family. It replaced an 1813 complex developed by Grandstaff that included a sawmill, grist mill and a carding operation. The present mill was almost burned during the American Civil War, when forces under Union general Philip Sheridan set fire to the mill as part of their scorched-earth campaign.  Local women convinced the soldiers to salvage the mill's flour, and the fire was extinguished, saving the mill.

The mill is three stories tall with a prominent gable formed by the deep roof structure. Shed-roofed extensions are found to either side of the gable, with a lean-to office addition at the front gable end. Although built in the 19th century, the mill uses some 18th-century techniques, such as shoulder posts.

Edinburg Mill is owned by the town of Edinburg in partnership with a preservation group. It was placed on the National Register of Historic Places on September 7, 1979.  It is included in the Edinburg Historic District.

References

External links
 Shenandoah Valley Cultural Heritage Museum at The Edinburg Mill - official site

Grinding mills on the National Register of Historic Places in Virginia
National Register of Historic Places in Shenandoah County, Virginia
Industrial buildings completed in 1848
Buildings and structures in Shenandoah County, Virginia
Museums in Shenandoah County, Virginia
Mill museums in Virginia
Individually listed contributing properties to historic districts on the National Register in Virginia
Grinding mills in Virginia
History museums in Virginia